The Marshall Islands competed at the 2016 Summer Olympics in Rio de Janeiro, Brazil, from 5 to 21 August 2016. This was the nation's third consecutive appearance at the Summer Olympics.

The Marshall Islands Olympic delegation included five athletes, competing only in athletics, swimming, and weightlifting. Among them were freestyle swimmer Giordan Harris, the lone returning Olympian from London 2012, and weightlifter Mathlynn Sasser (women's 58 kg), who led the contingent as the Marshall Islands flag bearer in the opening ceremony. The Marshall Islands made their Olympic debut in weightlifting and had one of their largest Olympic delegations, matching their size in 2008. The delegation, however, failed to win their first-ever Olympic medal.

History 
The Marshall Islands are a Micronesian island nation, located in the western Pacific Ocean midway between Hawaii and Australia. As of 2016 the nation had a population of approximately 53,000. The islands were under Spain's influence until their annexation by Germany in 1885. Japan occupied the Islands during World War I and formally annexed them as part of its postwar South Pacific Mandate. The Marshall Islands were placed under United States control in 1944. The islands granted independence in 1986 under a Compact of Free Association with the United States.

The Marshall Islands created its National Olympic Committee in 2001 and gained International Olympic Committee (IOC) recognition at their 9 February 2006 meeting. The addition of the Marshall Islands brought the total number of IOC-recognized National Olympic Committees to 203 at the time of admission.

Athletics

The Marshall Islands received universality slots from the International Association of Athletics Federations (IAAF) to send one male, and one female athlete, to the 2016 Summer Olympics. Richson Simeon represented the Marshall Islands in the men's 100 meter competition, and Mariana Cress represented the nation in the women's 100 meter. 

Both athletes failed to advance to their next rounds, with Simeon placing eighth in his heat with a time of 11:81, and Cress placing sixth with a time of 13:20. Jamaica and the United States won medals in both competitions, and Canada received one for the men's event.

Track & road events

Swimming

The Marshall Islands received universality invitations from FINA to send one male and one female swimmer to the 2016 Summer Olympics. 

Giordan Harris placed fifth in his heat for the men's 50 meter freestyle with a time of 25:81 and Colleen Furgeson placed first in the women's 50 meter freestyle with a time of 28:16, but both failed to advance to the next round. 

The United States won medals in both events, with France receiving a medal for the men's and Denmark and Belarus receiving medals for the women's competitions.

Weightlifting

The Marshall Islands received an invitation from the Tripartite Commission for Mathlynn Sasser to compete in the women's lightweight category (58 kg), signifying the nation's Olympic weightlifting debut. Sasser had a total score of 199, placing eleventh. The medals in the event went to athletes from Thailand and Chinese Taipei.

References

External links 
 

2016
Nations at the 2016 Summer Olympics
Oly